

Anthropology